Manor Farm is the name traditionally given to the farm of a manor house in England. Its produce was used to supply the manor. Due to its ancient origins, there are many uses of the name Manor Farm:

Manor Farm Country Park and its museum, in Botley, Hampshire 
Manor Farm, Pulham Market, Norfolk, a property owned by the Landmark Trust
Manor Farm, Ruislip, London
Manor Farm, Surrey, a nature reserve owned by the Surrey Wildlife Trust
Manor Farm, West Challow, Oxfordshire

Literature
Manor Farm is the setting of George Orwell's novel Animal Farm

See also
Home Farm (disambiguation), a similar sort of farm established after the end of manorialism